Eugène Anselme Sébastien Léon Desmarest (1816–1889) was a French zoologist and entomologist. He was the son of Anselme Gaëtan Desmarest (1734–1838).

Works
Partial list:
  In: Chenu, J.C., . Marescq et Compagnie, Paris. v.18, p. 123-181 (1860).
 . In: J. G. Chenu. v. 19, p. 1-360 + 1-62 (1874)

References

External links
BHL Encyclopédie d'histoire naturelle Scanned book

French entomologists
1816 births
1889 deaths